2,3-Dinitrophenol (2,3-DNP) is an organic compound with the formula HOC6H3(NO2)2. 2,3-Dinitrophenol is not planar due to rotation of nitro groups, and is acidic.

See also
 Dinitrophenol

References

Dinitrophenols